Francisco Barrera was a Spanish painter, best known for his appeal on behalf of his fellow artists against taxes proposed by the Spanish government in 1640.

References
 

Year of birth unknown
Year of death unknown
Spanish Baroque painters
17th-century Spanish people